William Patrick Spens, 1st Baron Spens, KBE, PC, KC (9 August 1885 – 15 November 1973) was a British lawyer, judge and Conservative politician. He served as Chief Justice of India from 1943 to 1947.

Biography 
Spens was the eldest of the six children of Nathaniel Spens, a chartered accountant and managing director of state liquidation, born in Glasgow and of Frimley, Surrey, and Emily Jessie Connal. His parents were of Scottish descent. Spens was educated at Rugby and New College, Oxford, and was called to the Bar by the Inner Temple in 1910. He served in the First World War as an adjutant in the 5th battalion of the Queen's Royal Regiment. After the war Spens started practising as a lawyer and became a King's Counsel (KC) in 1925. He unsuccessfully contested St Pancras South West in the 1929 general election, but was elected for Ashford in 1933.  In 1943 Spens was unexpectedly appointed Chief Justice of India. He retained this post until 1947.

He served from 1947 to 1948 as chairman of the tribunal set up to arbitrate between Indian judges disagreeing over the concept and substance of the Partition of India which had been announced by Lord Mountbatten and was being detailed by Sir Cyril Radcliffe's two boundary commissions (one for Bengal, one for present-day Pakistan).

Spens returned to Britain in 1949, and the following year he was elected as Member of Parliament (MP) for Kensington South. He stood down from Parliament in its recall for the 1959 general election.

Spens was knighted in 1943, appointed a KBE in 1948 and admitted to the Privy Council in 1953. After his retirement from the House of Commons in 1959 he was raised to the peerage as Baron Spens, of Blairsanquhar in the County of Fife.

Spens married firstly Hilda Mary, daughter of Wentworth Grenville Bowyer, in 1913. They had two sons. After his first wife's death in 1962 he married secondly Kathleen Annie Fedden, daughter of Roger Dodds. Lord Spens died in November 1973, aged 88. He was succeeded in the barony by his eldest and only surviving son, William.

Notes

References
Blake, Lord, Nicholls, C. S (editors). The Dictionary of National Biography, 1971-1980. Oxford: Oxford University Press, 1986.
Kidd, Charles, Williamson, David (editors). Debrett's Peerage and Baronetage (1990 edition). New York: St Martin's Press, 1990,

External links 
 

1885 births
1973 deaths
People educated at Rugby School
Alumni of New College, Oxford
British Army personnel of World War I
Members of the Privy Council of the United Kingdom
Chairmen of the 1922 Committee
Chief justices of India
British people in colonial India
Queen's Royal Regiment officers
Knights Bachelor
Knights Commander of the Order of the British Empire
Conservative Party (UK) MPs for English constituencies
UK MPs 1931–1935
UK MPs 1935–1945
UK MPs 1950–1951
UK MPs 1951–1955
UK MPs 1955–1959
UK MPs who were granted peerages
Hereditary barons created by Elizabeth II